The longtail dwarf goby (Knipowitschia longecaudata) is a species of goby native to the Black Sea, Sea of Azov, and the Caspian Sea where it is mostly found in areas of brackish water over sand or amongst weeds where it feeds on small invertebrates.  This species can reach a length of  TL.

References

longtail dwarf goby
Fish of the Black Sea
Fish of the Caspian Sea
Fish of the Sea of Azov
longtail dwarf goby